Gigi Fernández and Natasha Zvereva were the defending champions, but none competed this year.

Patty Fendick and Meredith McGrath won the title by defeating Amanda Coetzer and Inés Gorrochategui 6–2, 6–0 in the final.

Seeds

Draw

Draw

References

External links
 Official results archive (ITF)
 Official results archive (WTA)

Doubles
Bank of the West Classic